Léopold Corriveau (23 January 1926 in Thetford Mines, Quebec – 16 July 1998 in Thetford Mines) was a Liberal party member of the House of Commons of Canada. He was an electrician by career.

He was first elected at Frontenac electoral district in a 16 November 1970 by-election. He was re-elected in the 1972, 1974, 1979 and 1980 federal elections. In the 1984 federal election, he was defeated by Marcel Masse of the Progressive Conservative party.

Corriveau served for the latter part of the 29th Canadian Parliament, and for full terms in the 30th through 32nd Canadian Parliaments.

References

External links
 

1926 births
1998 deaths
Liberal Party of Canada MPs
Members of the House of Commons of Canada from Quebec
People from Thetford Mines